Neither Blood nor Sand is a 1941 Mexican comedy film directed by Alejandro Galindo and starring Cantinflas, Susana Guízar and Elvia Salcedo. It was intended as a parody of the big-budget Hollywood film Blood and Sand, which portrays the world of bullfighting.

It was Cantinflas' second full feature film, and its popularity cemented his rising success. He did not get on well with the film's director, but bonded with his assistant Miguel M. Delgado who became his favourite director and directed many of his films. Cantinflas rapidly followed the film with another success, The Unknown Policeman.

The film's sets were designed by the art director Jorge Fernandez.

Cast
 Cantinflas as Cantinflas / Manolete  
 Susana Guízar as Anita  
 Elvia Salcedo as Lupita  
 Pedro Armendáriz as Frank  
 Alfredo del Diestro as Don Ramón  
 Fernando Soto as Charifas  
 Miguel Inclán as Jefe de Policía  
 Paz Villegas as Doña Remedios  
 Salvador Quiroz as Don Pancho  
 Arturo Soto Rangel as Juez

References

Bibliography 
 Mora, Carl J. Mexican Cinema: Reflections of a Society, 1896–2004. McFarland & Co, 2005.

External links 
 

1941 comedy films
1941 films
Mexican comedy films
1940s Spanish-language films
Films directed by Alejandro Galindo
Mexican black-and-white films
1940s Mexican films